Dalit Makkal Munnetra Kazhagam (Dalit Popular Progressive Federation), political party in the Indian state of Tamil Nadu. The party works for the rights of Dalits. The president of the party is Dalit Kudimagan. Dalit Kudimagan stood in the Lok Sabha elections 2004 from the constituency Madras Central and got 293 votes (0,06%). DMMK was a part of the Dalit third front in Tamil Nadu in the 2004 elections.

Political parties in Tamil Nadu
Political parties with year of establishment missing